Koranyi or Korányi is a Hungarian surname, which is a Hungarian form of the German surname Kornfeld (meaning "cornfield"). Hungarian doctor Frigyes Korányi and his family pioneered the name when they changed their surname from Kornfeld to Korányi in the 1830s, upon converting from Judaism to Catholicism. The name may refer to:

Ádám Korányi, Hungarian-American mathematician
Balázs Korányi (born 1974), Hungarian athlete
Dávid Korányi (born 1980), Hungarian diplomat
Désiré Koranyi (1914–1981), French football player
Frigyes Korányi (physician) (1828–1913), Hungarian doctor 
Frigyes Korányi (politician) (1869–1935), Hungarian politician
Jacob Koranyi (born 1983), Swedish cellist
Lajos Korányi (1907–1981), Hungarian footballer
Sándor Korányi (1866–1944), Hungarian doctor
Stephan Koranyi (born 1956), German philologist and editor

See also 
Kevin Kurányi (born 1982), German footballer

References

Hungarian-language surnames
Jewish surnames